Western Esotericism is an academic field of research, scholarship, and education that focuses on the history of European and Western esotericism.

Origins and development
The academic study of Western esotericism was pioneered in the early 20th century by historians of the ancient world and the European Renaissance, who came to recognise that – although it had been ignored by previous scholarship – the impact which pre-Christian and non-rational schools of thought had exerted on European society and culture was worthy of academic attention. One of the key centres for this was the Warburg Institute in London, where scholars like Frances Yates, Edgar Wind, Ernst Cassier, and D. P. Walker began arguing that esoteric thought had had a greater impact on Renaissance culture than had been previously accepted. In 1965, the world's first academic post in the study of esotericism was established at the École pratique des hautes études in the Sorbonne, Paris; named the chair in the History of Christian Esotericism, its first holder was François Secret, a specialist in the Christian Kabbalah. In 1979 the scholar Antoine Faivre assumed Secret's chair at the Sorbonne, which was renamed the "History of Esoteric and Mystical Currents in Modern and Contemporary Europe". Faivre has since been cited as being responsible for developing the study of Western esotericism into a formalised field.

Faivre noted that there were two significant obstacles to establishing the field. One was that there was an engrained prejudice towards esotericism within academia, resulting in the widespread perception that the history of esotericism was not worthy of academic research. The second was that esotericism is a trans-disciplinary field, the study of which did not fit clearly within any particular discipline. As Hanegraaff noted, Western esotericism had to be studied as a separate field to religion, philosophy, science, and the arts, because while it "participates in all these fields" it does not squarely fit into any of them.

In 1980, the U.S.-based Hermetic Academy was founded by Robert A. McDermott as an outlet for scholars interested in Western esotericism. From 1986 to 1990 members of the Hermetic Academy participated in panels at the annual meeting of the American Academy of Religion under the rubric of the "Esotericism and Perennialism Group". By 1994, Faivre could comment that the academic study of Western esotericism had taken off in France, Italy, England, and the United States, but he lamented the fact that it had not done so in Germany.
By 2008, there were three dedicated university chairs in the subject, at the University of Sorbonne, University of Amsterdam, and the University of Exeter, with the latter two institutions also offering master's degree programs in it.

On the basis of the fact that "English culture and literature have been traditional strongholds of Western esotericism", in 2011 Pia Brînzeu and György Szönyi urged that English studies also have a role in this interdisciplinary field.

Schools
The following Universities have academic chairs in the subject:
 University of Amsterdam in the Netherlands
 École pratique des hautes études in France

Specific degrees that can be granted include:
 MA and rMA in Religious Studies: Western Esotericism track, from University of Amsterdam
 PhD in Religious Studies: Mysticism, Gnosticism & Esotericism Concentration, from Rice University.

Societies
Association for the Study of Esotericism (North America)
European Society for the Study of Western Esotericism

References

Footnotes

Sources

External links

 Association for the Study of Esotericism (ASE) 
 Center for History of Hermetic Philosophy and Related Currents, University of Amsterdam
 University of Exeter Centre for the Study of Esotericism (EXESESO)
 Esoterica. A peer-reviewed academic journal devoted to the transdisciplinary study of Western esotericism
 MA in Western Esotericism from Exeter

Western esotericism
Religious studies